Huang Kunming (born November 1956) is a Chinese politician, currently serving as the Communist Party secretary of Guangdong and a member of the Politburo of the Chinese Communist Party. Until 2022, he served as the head of the Publicity Department of the Chinese Communist Party. He joined the Publicity Department in 2014 as a deputy head. Prior to his appointment he served in Fujian and Zhejiang provinces, and is considered a close associate of Xi Jinping, the current general secretary of the Chinese Communist Party. He was the one time Communist Party secretary of Hangzhou.

Career
Huang was born in Shanghang County, Fujian province. In December 1974, Huang began serving in the People's Liberation Army. Two years later, he joined the Chinese Communist Party. In 1977, after serving for three years in the army, he went back to his home county and became a secretary. He entered Fujian Normal University in 1978. After graduation, he was sent by the party to work in the Longyan region of Fujian in a series of administrative roles. He later rose through the hierarchy to become Party Committee Secretary of Yongding County, then in February 1998, following the conversion of the administrative status of Longyan from a Prefecture into a "City", Huang became its mayor.

In August 1999, he was sent to the city of Huzhou in neighbouring Zhejiang province to serve as mayor. In February 2003, he became party secretary of Jiaxing, a prosperous city on China's east coast. By June 2007, Huang was named a member of the provincial Party Standing Committee and the head of the provincial party organization's Publicity Department. At around the same time, he earned a Masters of Public Administration from Tsinghua University. In January 2010, Huang was named party secretary of Hangzhou, one of about a dozen cities with "sub-provincial" status in China.

Huang became an alternate member of the 18th Central Committee of the Chinese Communist Party held in the fall of 2012. In October 2013, he was named deputy head of the Central Publicity Department. In December 2014, he was promoted to executive deputy head, with rank equivalent to that of a minister. The executive deputy head position of the Publicity Department is a powerful one, as it oversees roughly all day-to-day administrative aspects of the department. External observers have called Huang's installation in the position as a means to check the influence of Liu Yunshan, a member of the party's top ruling body the Politburo Standing Committee who is widely believed to be a conservative. Huang was also named chief of the Office of the Central Guidance Commission on Building Spiritual Civilization.

The later years of Huang's career roughly follows in the footsteps of Xi Jinping, who was named General Secretary of the Communist Party in 2012. Huang began working with Xi in Fujian province where Xi served as governor. Later Huang moved to Zhejiang during Xi's term as Party Committee Secretary there. After Xi rose to become party leader, Huang again was transferred from Zhejiang to the party centre. Because of Huang's close links with Xi, he is considered a member of the New Zhijiang Army, an informal grouping of Xi's closest associates who were considered destined for higher office. After the 19th Party Congress, Huang became head of the Publicity Department, and a member of the Politburo of the Chinese Communist Party. Shortly thereafter he also became head of a task force on combating pornography and illegal publications.

Huang was an alternate member of the 18th Central Committee of the Chinese Communist Party, and a full member of the 19th Central Committee.

References 

Tsinghua University alumni
Politicians from Longyan
Living people
Members of the 20th Politburo of the Chinese Communist Party
Members of the 19th Politburo of the Chinese Communist Party
People's Republic of China politicians from Fujian
1956 births
Alternate members of the 18th Central Committee of the Chinese Communist Party
Chinese Communist Party politicians from Fujian
Hakka politicians